"Shake Tramp" is a song by Canadian pop punk group Marianas Trench. It was released in September 2007 as the third single from their debut album Fix Me. The song reached number 65 on the Canadian Hot 100 and the #1 spot on the MuchMusic Countdown of Friday, August 10, 2007. The song was also featured on an episode of Video on Trial.

Composition
The song was written by lead singer Josh Ramsay with Dave Genn producing the track. The song runs at 162 BPM and is in the key of B major. The song is described as their "breakthrough single" however, some criticize the lyric, "they slap you like a bitch and you take it like a whore," as uncomfortable.

Accolades

|-
| 2007 || "Shake Tramp" || SOCAN No.1 song award || 
|-
|  || "Shake Tramp" || Juno Video of the Year || 
|-

Music video
The music video for "Shake Tramp" begins with a montage of all the members of the band singing the beginning harmonies. The camera focus is then directed to lead singer Josh Ramsay walking down a street (filmed in Burnaby Village Museum, Burnaby, B.C.) set in the early 20th century. He interacts and socializes with the people, all of whom appear to love him. This section ends with Ramsay accidentally getting hit in the face by a man (Biji) carrying a ladder. He collapses and blacks out. When he wakes up Ramsay is on the same street, but in current time. He is still dancing and trying to interact with the same people, however this time they treat him harshly. A woman he danced with in the last segment, sprays him in the eyes with pepper spray. As he walks around the town, more people begin to insult him until he finally arrives in an outdoor mosh. The rest of the band (Matt, Mike and Ian) are playing here, and as he joins them for the last chorus. Their music is received well and the townspeople are dancing along. It appears to go back to the time period used in the beginning of the video, with the exception of the members of the band who are dressed in modern apparel. 

There are many choreographed dance sequences performed by Ramsay throughout the video which he stated he had to take 2 months of dance instruction to prepare for. The music video was nominated at the 2008 Juno Awards for "Video of the Year".

Charts

Certifications

References

2006 songs
Songs written by Josh Ramsay
Marianas Trench (band) songs